The Visual Encyclopedia of Science Fiction is an illustrated collection of bibliographic essays on the history and subject matter of science fiction. It was edited by Brian Ash and published in 1977 by Pan Books in the UK and Harmony/Crown Books in the US.

Summary
The book starts with a parallel chronology of significant events in the fields of science fiction stories, magazines, novels, movies/TV/radio, and fandom, from 1805 to 1976. The book's thematic sections contain introductions by science fiction authors, and extensive bibliographies of science fiction works featuring each theme. It includes extended essays on science fiction, called "Deep Probes". The chapters are numbered in the style of a technical manual. Illustrations are primarily book and magazine covers, and interior illustrations from magazines, including a number of illustrations by Virgil Finlay, among others.  The anthologist and editor Mike Ashley is credited in the book as "Principal Research Consultant".

Reception
The book received positive reviews within the field of children's literature, including the American Library Association. Reviews from the field of science fiction were less enthusiastic:

See also
 The Encyclopedia of Science Fiction
 The Encyclopedia of Fantasy
 The Greenwood Encyclopedia of Science Fiction and Fantasy

References
Notes

Bibliography

 Ash, Brian. The Visual Encyclopedia of Science Fiction. Brian Ash, ed. Harmony Books, 1977. .
 Clute, John and Peter Nicholls. The Encyclopedia of Science Fiction. New York: St. Martin's Griffin, 1995. .
 Katz, Bill and Ruth A. Fraley. Reference Services for Children and Young Adults. New York: The Haworth Press, Inc., 1983. .
 Mullen, R.D. [http://www.depauw.edu/sfs/reviews_pages/r15.htm#B15 Science Fiction Studies #15, Vol. 5, Part 2, July 1978]. Greencastle, IN: DePauw University, 1978.

External links
 "Science Fiction Studies #15, Vol. 5, Part 2, July 1978", DePauw University
 

1977 non-fiction books
20th-century encyclopedias
American encyclopedias
British encyclopedias
Encyclopedias of literature
Science fiction books
Science fiction studies
Pan Books books
Harmony Books books